Christian Baumann (born 25 February 1995) is a Swiss artistic gymnast and a member of the national team. He participated at the 2015 World Artistic Gymnastics Championships in Glasgow, and qualified for the 2016 Summer Olympics. His biggest success is the silver medal at the 2015 European Championship in Montpellier on the parallel bars.

Competitive history

Baumann element 
In April 2017, the Technical Committee of the International Gymnastics Federation officially included a personalized "trick" named after Baumann as a scoring element. The new F element corresponds in future to a degree of difficulty of 0.6 points. At the World Cup qualification in Doha in March 2017 Christian Baumann performed the element for the first time in a competition.

Personal life
Baumann was born 25 February 1995. He started gymnastics at the age of five at the TV Lenzburg club in Switzerland.

References

External links 
 

1995 births
Living people
Swiss male artistic gymnasts
Place of birth missing (living people)
Gymnasts at the 2016 Summer Olympics
Olympic gymnasts of Switzerland
Gymnasts at the 2020 Summer Olympics